Koreli or Coreli is the name of a Thracian tribe. They are mentioned by Livy.

References

See also
List of Thracian tribes

Ancient tribes in the Balkans
Thracian tribes